Fjord Line is a Norwegian ferry operator offering services between Norway and Denmark; in October 2020 the company announced a scale-back of operations whereby the ferry operations will only serve the ports of Kristiansand, Hirtshals, and Stavanger.

In addition to passenger transport, Fjord line operates cargo transport through its cargo division in Norway and Denmark.

History
Fjord Line was founded in 1993.  In 1998 the company purchased the MS Jupiter and the Bergen - Newcastle route from Color Line.

In 2004 a much larger ship, the MS Fjord Norway was purchased to operate the Norway - Denmark service.  The MS Bergen was chartered to DFDS.

Following heavy competition on the Norway - Denmark route, in 2005 Fjord Line began streamlining operations.  On return of the MS Bergen from charter, the MS Fjord Norway and the Norway - UK route were sold to DFDS.  The MS Jupiter was laid up for sale.

On 1 January 2008 Fjord Line merged with fast ferry operator Master Ferries.

The MS Stavangerfjord was awarded for Best Ship Design at the 2014 Shippax Awards.

In 2014 Fjord Line became the world's first ferry operator to use contactless radio frequency identification RFID smart cards for the cabin locks. This solution was provided by Carus Ferry Ltd Ab.

Routes
Fjord Line operates routes between Norway, Denmark and Sweden.

Kristiansand - Hirtshals (Summer only) (Concurrency with Color Line)
Stavanger - Bergen
Sandefjord - Strömstad (Concurrency with Color Line)
 Langesund - Hirtshals

Fleet

Current fleet
Fjord Line currently operates four vessels.

Past fleet

References

External links
Fjordline web site

Ferry companies of Norway